Adeena Karasick (born June 1, 1965) is a Canadian poet, performance artist, and essayist. Born in Winnipeg of Russian Jewish heritage, she has authored several books of poetry and poetic theory, as well as a series of parodic videopoems, such as the ironic "I Got a Crush on Osama" that was featured on Fox News and screened at film festivals, Ceci n'est pas un Téléphone or Hooked on Telephonics: A Pata-philophonemic Investigation of the Telephone created for The Media Ecology Association, "Lingual Ladies"  a post-modern parody of Beyoncé's "Single Ladies", and "This is Your Final Nitrous" a poetic response to the Burning Man Festival., White Abbot, a parodic videopoem Karasick created during the writing of Salome dedicated to the impossible anguish of forbidden love, and  Medium in a Messy Age: Communication in the Era of Technology created for the 71st Annual New York State Communication Association Conference and the Institute of General Semantics, 2013.

Her eighth book, This Poem, which was released in August 2012, opened on The Globe and Mail Bestseller List for Winnipeg. It was also named one of the Top Five Poetry Books of 2012 by The Jewish Daily Forward. One of her most recent projects is The Medium is the Muse: Channeling Marshall McLuhan, co-edited with Lance Strate (NeoPoiesis Press, 2014). She teaches literature, critical theory and performance at the Pratt Institute and global literature at St. John's University and is co-founding director of KlezKanada Poetry Festival and Retreat.

Education 

Karasick received her Ph.D., in 1997 from Concordia University in Montreal and was the first interdisciplinary scholarship, which linked the work of French deconstructionist philosophy with 13th-century hermeneutics.  Her doctoral dissertation, Of Poetic Thinking: A 'Pataphysical Investigation of Cixous, Derrida and the Kabbalah, examined the relationship between the major texts of Kabbalistic discourse and contemporary deconstructionist and literary practices.

Teaching career 

Karasick is a visiting assistant professor at Pratt Institute teaching literature and critical theory and performance and professor of global literature at St. John's University. Prior to that, she was an associate professor of communication and media theory at Fordham University From 2000 to 2012, she held teaching positions at St. John's University. Between 2008 and 2010, Karasick taught writing and film and literature at the Borough of Manhattan Community College. Between 1991 and 1992, and from 1993 to 1996, Karasick taught Canadian contemporary literature and cultural theory at York University, Canada, and in 1992 was writer in residence at the Gutenberg Universität in Mainz, Germany.

Bibliography
 The Empress Has No Closure (Talonbooks, 1992) 
 Mêmewars (Talonbooks, 1994) 
 Genrecide (Talonbooks, 1996) 
 Dyssemia Sleaze (Talonbooks, Spring 2000) 
 The Arugula Fugues (Zasterle Press, 2001) 
 The House That Hijack Built (Talonbooks, 2004) 
 Amuse Bouche: Tasty Treats for the Mouth (Talonbooks 2009) 
 This Poem (Talonbooks, 2012) 
 The Medium is the Muse: Channeling Marshall McLuhan co-edited with Lance Strate (NeoPoiesis Press, 2014)

Projects and collaborations 
Both her poetic and scholarly work focuses on issues of contemporary writing strategies, media, culture and aesthetics and has been described as "electricity in language." Nicole Brossard, "a twined virtuosity of mind and ear which leaves the reader deliciously lost in Karasick's signature 'syllabic labyrinth.'" Craig Dworkin, "a delirious interplay of tongue twisting cacophony and serious exploration of language and meaning." Herizons, "plural, cascading, exuberant, in their cross fertilization of punning and knowing, theory and theatre", Charles Bernstein.

Her ongoing collaboration with Maria Damon, Intertextile: Text in Exile: Shmata Mash-Up,  explores the interwoven relationship between gender and textuality and debuted at The Banff Centre for the Arts and The Poets House in New York.

Her study of the Kabbalistic traces in Charles Bernstein's opera, Shadowtime and her ongoing work tracing the patterns and intersections between Kabbalah and Contemporary poetics ("Hijacking Language") were published in Radical Poetics and Secular Jewish Culture (University of Alabama Press, 2012). An analysis by Maria Damon of Karasick's own poetry also appears in the book. According to Jake Marmer, "Karasick is after the "meaning that is not fixed but in flux, fluid; a logic that is often illogical; a rationality that is not irrational but relational and affirms that like the text itself we must embrace contradiction, conflict, discordance."

A study of Kenny Goldsmith and conceptual poetry and its relation to 13th-century textual practices was presented at The Kelly Writer's House, University of Pennsylvania, as part of North of Invention: Festival of Canadian Poetry.

An investigation of the relationship between conceptual writing, media and pop culture, "Glammed Out, Googley-Eyed and Gangsta: Parody, Satire and Cultural Sampling in the Age of Media Obsession" was presented at the New Jersey Institute of Technology, 2011.

Her work on the language and locus of Marshall McLuhan includes "In My Blogal Village, Print is Hot" for the "Cityscapes" session of the Marshall McLuhan Centennial (Signals from the DEW Line: Art and Poetry in the Global Village), University of Toronto, and  "We'll Cross that Road When We Come to It: On Media, Writing, and Creativity" at the 13th Annual Convention of the Media Ecology Association, Manhattan College.

"Exile & Nomadicism: A Community Manifesto" was presented at the Poetry Communities and the Individual Talent Conference, University of Pennsylvania and printed in Jacket2, 2012.

Since 1989, Karasick has collaborated in both print and performance with fellow poet bill bissett and in June 2011, they embarked on a 20th Anniversary World Performance Tour (The Bouchetime Tour) through London, Manchester, Paris, Geneva, Barcelona, Ghent and St. Petersburg promoting sound collage and asemic performance. In November 2012, they celebrated a lifetime of work with The 25th anniversary jubilee celebration of Adeena Karasick & bill bissett collaborations & the Toronto launch for This Poem and novel, which was streamed on the Occupy Toronto channel of Livestream.

Videos, films, and CDs 
 Back in the O.S.V.R.: Medium, Messages and Mysticism: Binding Time With the Ghost in the Machine Created for and screened as part of "The Media IS the Message: Multi-Media and the Future of Publishing" (with Ralph Rivera, BBC Future Media), for BookExpo America 2014, and the 72nd Annual New York State Communication Association Conference and the 62nd Alfred Korzybski Memorial Lecture and Symposium for the Institute of General Semantics, in New York, 2014
 White Abbot, a parodic videopoem Karasick created during the writing of Salome dedicated to the impossible anguish of forbidden love.
 Medium in a Messy Age: Communication in the Era of Technology created for the 71st Annual New York State Communication Association Conference and the Institute of General Semantics, 2013.
 Ceci n'est pas un Téléphone or Hooked on Telephonics: A Pata-philophonemic Investigation of the Telephone created for the Communication and Media Studies Department, Fordham University, and the Media Ecology Association Convention, 2012. 
 Lingual Ladies (Video), Produced for Banff Centre for the Arts, 2011.
 I got a crush on Osama (Video), Aired on Fox News, 2009.

Today's politics have reached such a completely absurd level, I felt compelled to comment," said Adeena Karasick of her new video I Got a Crush on Osama released today on YouTube to help promote her new book from Talonbooks, Amuse Bouche: Tasty Treats for the Mouth. The book is a delectable feast of her trademark poetry combining the obsessions of popular culture, politics and linguistic theory into a multi-layered banquet of language often humorous and wry, surprising and sometimes shocking in its juxtapositions, reflecting the often ludicrousness of the techno-saturated world we live in.

 Heart of a Poet (TV Show) Produced for Bravo TV, Maureen Judd and Leslie Valpy (Makin' Movies) 2006.
 This is your final nitrous (Video) Produced for Visible Verse Festival, 2005. 
 Sefer yetzirah (Video) Blaine Spiegel. Produced for St. Mark's Poetry Project: NYC, 2004.
 Belle L'être (Video) Produced for St. Mark's Poetry Project. A. Karasick and Marianne Shaneen: NYC, 2002.
 Ribsauce (CD) "Cuadrilla Cadre" Produced by Alex Boutros and Karla Sundström, Wired on Words: Montreal, 2001.
 Prairis/cite maintenance (Video) Produced for Bravo TV, Toronto, 2000.
 Mumbai-Ya (Video) Produced by M. Rosatto-Bennett, NYC, 2000.
 Alphabet City (Video) Produced by A. Karasick: NYC, 1999.
 Women i know (Film) Produced by Pauline Urquhart for Alberta Access Television: NYC, 1998.
 At the fetish cafe (Video) Produced by Lee Gotham: Montreal, 1996.
 Action poetry '94 (Video) Produced at Banff Centre for Performing Arts with Meryn Cadell, Bob Holman, Clifton Joseph, Kedrick James: Alberta: 1994.
 Sensasound 90 (Cassette) with Lillian Allen, Rafael Baretto-Rivera, bill bissett, Paul Dutton, Penn Kemp, Steve McCaffery: Toronto, 1991.
 Language lives (Video) Canadian Poet Series with bp Nichol, Steve McCaffery, Lola Tostevin, bill bissett: Toronto, 1991.
 Liquid waze (Cassette) with bill bissett: Vancouver, 1990.
 Reading performance (Video) with Allen Ginsberg, Gregory Corso, bill bissett

Awards and grants 
 2012 The Jewish Daily Forward Top Five Poetry Books in 2012 for This Poem
 2009 Listing in Poetry Picks 2009 on About.com for Amuse Bouche 
 2000 Bumbershoot Book Fair Award, "Most Adventurous Publication" for Dyssemia Sleaze
 1999 People's Choice Award, for "Alphabet City", Electrolit International Videopoem Festival, Vancouver, BC
 1995 Finalist in the Dorothy Livesay Poetry Prize for Mêmewars

Anthologies 
In addition to the anthologies below, Karasick's work also has appeared in literary magazines, and academic journals and publications.

 "My Love is Like a Fine, Fine Wine" in Voices Israel 2010 Volume 36, (Eds. Michael Dickel and Sheryl Abbey, 2010). 
 "You are Advised" in The Portable Boog Reader 3: An Anthology of New York City Poetry, (Ed. David Kirschenbaum, Spring, 2009). 
 "Echographies" in Future Welcome: The Moosehead Anthology X, (Ed. Todd Swift. D.C. Books, 2006). 
 "After the Anti Oedipus" in In Our Own Words: A Generation Defining Itself, (Ed. Marlow Peerse Weaver, MW Enterprises, 2005). 
 "In the Amplifying Cave" and "What it Really Comes Down to Is..." in Hysteria, (Ed. Jennifer Savran. LunaSea Books, Summer, 2003). 
 "In the Empire of Grief.II" in Short Fuse, (Ed. Todd Swift, Paris, France, October, 2002). 
 "Ambit. Ardour. Orders: A Poetics of Polymedial Pasties in side/lines: A New Canadian Poetics (Ed. Rob Mclennan, Insomniac Press, Toronto, 2002). 
 "Belle L'être" in Vox Populi, Ed. Danika Dinsmore. Seattle, April 2002. 
 "from The Arugula Fugues" in The Portable Booglit Reader, (Ed. David Kirschenbaum, New York, NY, November, 2000). 
 "Mumbai-Ya" in DC Anthology, (Ed. Allison Cobb, Jen Coleman, Washington, DC, December, 2000). 
 "Telephone Talk" in Sisters of the Extreme: Women Writing on the Drug Experience, (Ed. Cynthia Palmer and Michael Horowitz. Park Street Press, Rochester Vermont, 2000) 
 "Mellah Marrano" in Contemporary Verse 2: Canadian Women's Writing at Century's End. Vol. 23 No.1 (Summer, 2000). 
 "Genrecide" in Poetry Nation: A North American Anthology of Fusion Poets. (Ed. Regie Cabico and Todd Swift. Vehicle Press, Quebec, 1998). 
 From "Genrecide" in Carnival: Scream in High Park Reader (Ed. Peter McPhee. Insomniac Press: Toronto, 1996). 
 "Telephone Talk" in Revival: Spoken Word from Lollapalooza 94. Ed. Juliette Torrez, Liz Belile, Mud Baron, Jennifer Joseph. (Manic D Press: San Francisco, 1995). 
 From "Cut Throat" in Front Lines Anthology of Action Poetry. Vol. I. (Banff: April, 1994). 
 "Bad" in Front Lines Anthology of Action Poetry. Vol. II. (Banff: April, 1994). 
 "Poetix" in Writing for the New Coast Anthology (Buffalo, 1993).

References

External links
 Official website

Canadian women poets
Pataphysicians
Artists from Winnipeg
Writers from Winnipeg
1965 births
Living people
Canadian performance artists
Women performance artists
20th-century Canadian poets
21st-century Canadian poets
Jewish Canadian writers
20th-century Canadian women writers
21st-century Canadian women writers